Reptilian is a bobsled roller coaster located at Kings Dominion in Doswell, Virginia, United States. Manufactured by Mack Rides, the roller coaster debuted as Avalanche in 1988 and was renamed to Reptilian in 2022 following a refurbishment. The change coincided with the addition of a new themed area at the park called Jungle X-Pedition.

History
In late 1987, Kings Dominion announced that a bobsled roller coaster named Avalanche at the time would be added for the 1988 season. It officially opened to the general public on March 26, 1988.

Initially, the ride was themed after Olympic bobsleds that represented five countries. The countries included France, the United States, Germany, Switzerland and Canada. Each car had its country specific Winter Olympic decals.

The coaster did not operate for the 2020 season due to the park being closed for the COVID-19 pandemic. The coaster also remained closed for the 2021 season due to the nearby construction of Tumbili. 

During the 2021-2022 off-season, Avalanche was repainted orange and rethemed as Reptilian as part of the park's new Jungle X-Pedition area.

Features
Reptilian features chutes or half pipes without any fixed tracks like most other roller coasters. Having no tracks allows the bobsled cars to move freely.

Cars
Each car in Reptilian is themed as a crocodile and seats two riders. One rider sits in between the legs of the first rider.

References

External links
Official Avalanche page

Roller coasters in Virginia
Roller coasters introduced in 1988
Kings Dominion
Roller coasters operated by Cedar Fair
1988 establishments in Virginia]